Parliamentary elections were held in Nigeria on 7 July 1979 for the first time since 1964 to elect a Senate and House of Representatives on 14 July. The result was a victory for the National Party of Nigeria, which won 36 of the 95 Senate seats and 168 of the 449 House seats. It formed a coalition with the Nigerian People's Party in order to gain a majority. Voter turnout was just 30.7% in the House election.

Electoral system
Members of both houses were elected using the single-member plurality electoral system. Each State was divided into five districts, each of which elected a Senator. Each State was also allocated a number of seats in the House of Representatives based on its proportion of the population.

Results

Senate

Results by state

House of Representatives

By state

References

Nigeria
1979 elections in Nigeria
Parliamentary elections in Nigeria
Election and referendum articles with incomplete results